The Arizona Green Party (AZGP) is the officially recognized affiliate of the Green Party in the state of Arizona. It was founded by Carolyn Campbell alongside others in the 1990s. The current Co-Chairpersons of the Arizona Green Party are Sam Hales, whose term expires January 2023, and Cody Hannah, whose term expires January 2024.

History

Ballot access
In 2008, the Arizona Green Party gathered enough signatures to gain ballot access. The party had worked with Arizona's ballot access laws, achieving ballot access for the 2000 election cycle, then losing it again in 2004.  On March 6, 2008, the Arizona deadline for ballot access, the Arizona Green Party submitted 29,300 signatures on its petition for party recognition. The legal requirement is 20,449. On April 9, 2008, Arizona Secretary of State Jan Brewer announced that the Arizona Green Party had enough valid signatures to be recognized as an official political party.

On April 28, 2011, Governor Jan Brewer signed HB 2304, which says that when a new party qualifies, it is entitled to be on the ballot in the next two elections, not just the next election. As a result, the Green Party was automatically on the ballot for 2012 because it had successfully petitioned in 2010.

In 2016, the Arizona Green Party successfully sued the state of Arizona to ensure its presidential nominee, Jill Stein, was placed on the ballot after the party failed to submit a slate of Presidential electors on time. Jill Stein received a total of 34,345 votes in Arizona, leaving her with 1.3% of the total vote.

Campaigns
Prominent Green candidates in Arizona have included Vance Hansen, who ran for the US Senate in 2000 and received 108,926 votes. Claudia Ellquist ran for Pima County Attorney in 2004 on a platform largely focused on declaring a moratorium on the death penalty. Dave Croteau ran for mayor of Tucson in 2007 on a platform of relocalization and received over 28% of the vote.

2016 primary election results
The Arizona Green Party held its primary on March 22, 2016. Jill Stein won with 79.6% of the vote, and the overall number of voters that took part in the primary saw an increase from 561 in 2012 to 817 in 2016. Only two candidates qualified for the primary:

Election results

President

Senate

House of Representatives

See also

Political party strength in Arizona
2000 United States Senate election in Arizona
2016 United States Senate election in Arizona

References

External links
Arizona Green Party (Official site)

Green Party
Green Party of the United States by state
Political parties in Arizona
State and local socialist parties in the United States